Eduard Albert (20 January 1841, Žamberk, Bohemia – 26 September 1900, Žamberk), was a surgeon, professor and historian working under the Austro-Hungarian Empire.

Life 
Eduard Albert was born in Žamberk, Bohemia in the family of clockmaker František Albert and Kateřina Albertová (née Zdobnická). Further famous persons from their family were also František Albert (1856–1923), surgeon and writer, Tereza Svatová (1858–1940), writer and Kateřina Thomová (1861–1952), notable creatress of amateur theatre in Žamberk and founder of municipal museum in Žamberk.

Eduard Albert studied medicine at the University of Vienna, where he earned his doctorate in 1867. At Vienna he was a student of Salomon Stricker (1834–1898) and Johann von Dumreicher (1815–1880). From 1873 to 1881, he was a professor of surgery in Innsbruck, where he introduced mandatory antiseptic treatment for wounds. In 1881 Albert attained the chair of surgery in Vienna, where he remained until 1900. He was succeeded at Innsbruck in 1881 by Carl Nicoladoni (1847–1902).

Albert is remembered for pioneer research in the field of orthopedic surgery, in particular work involving tarsal and shoulder arthrodesis for paralysis and recurring joint dislocations. Among his better-known students were Adolf Lorenz (1854–1946), "The Bloodless Surgeon of Vienna", nephrologist Emerich Ullmann (1861-1937) and Antonio Grossich (1849–1926), who in 1908 introduced a procedure for applying the operative field with 10% tincture of iodine (at first in emergency surgeries, later on for all types of surgery).

Works 
 Diagnostika chirurgických nemocí (1876)
 Učebnice chirurgie a nauky operační (1877)
 Paměti Žamberské (1889)

Gallery

References 
 Eduard Albert @ Who Named It.

1841 births
1900 deaths
People from Žamberk
People from the Kingdom of Bohemia
19th-century Czech people
19th-century Czech poets
Austro-Hungarian poets
Austro-Hungarian surgeons
19th-century male writers